Webb Middle School may refer to:
 Webb Middle School - Austin Independent School District - Austin, Texas
 Cecil Webb Middle School - Garland Independent School District - Garland, Texas
 Webb Middle School - School District of Reedsburg - Reedsburg, Wisconsin